'''West Hill Cemetery]] may refer to:

 West Hill Cemetery, New York, a historic cemetery in Chenango County, New York, US
 West Hill Cemetery, Winchester, a historic cemetery in the city of Winchester, Hampshire, UK